Don Francesco Antonio Maria Matarazzo, Count Matarazzo (March 9, 1854 in Castellabate – December 10, 1937 in São Paulo, Brazil), was an Italian-born Brazilian businessman who created a large business in South America, particularly in Brazil.

Biography 
He was born in Castellabate, Salerno, Italy, the eldest of Doctor Costabile Matarazzo's nine sons, and Mariangela Jovane. At the age of 26, when Italian emigration to Brazil was widespread, he moved to  the city of Sorocaba, São Paulo with his brothers, wife and children. Initially he sold oranges and lottery tickets and shined shoes, reinvesting the proceeds in new businesses, eventually including plantations of tea, coffee, corn, rice, rubber and cotton.

In 1890, he moved to the city of São Paulo and with his brothers, Giuseppe and Luigi, founded the company Matarazzo and Irmãos. He diversified its business and imported wheat flour from the United States. Giuseppe took part in the company with a lard factory in Porto Alegre and Luigi with a deposit-warehouse in São Paulo.

The following year the company was dissolved and replaced by Companhia Matarazzo S.A. with 43 minority shareholders. This corporation also controlled the factories in Sorocaba and Porto Alegre.

The outbreak of the Spanish-American War made it difficult to buy wheat flour and he obtained credit from the London and Brazilian Bank to build a mill in São Paulo. From there, his business expanded rapidly to a total of 365 factories throughout Brazil. The conglomerate became the fourth largest in the country and 6% of the population depended on its factories in São Paulo. The business was renamed Indústrias Reunidas Francisco Matarazzo (IRFM) in 1911.

The Gestapo spy Hans Wesemann reported that:

In recognition of his financial and material assistance to Italy during the First World War King Victor Emmanuel III granted him the title of Count.

Matarazzo died in 1937 after an attack of uremia. At that time he was Brazil's richest man, with an estimated fortune of 20 billion U.S. dollars.

See also
Matarazzo Building
São Paulo Museum of Modern Art

References

1854 births
1937 deaths
Counts of Italy
People from the Province of Salerno
Brazilian businesspeople
Italian businesspeople
Italian emigrants to Brazil